Carl Sundberg was an American football coach. He served as the head football coach at Carthage College in Carthage, Illinois for one season, in 1906, compiling a record of 3–2.

Head coaching record

References

Year of birth missing
Year of death missing
Carthage Firebirds football coaches